Moritz Borman is a veteran film producer. His credits include K-19: The Widowmaker, The Life of David Gale, Mindhunters, Nurse Betty, Alexander, Terminator 3: Rise of the Machines and Terminator Salvation.

Borman was a German television producer and director in the 1970s and became a Directing Fellow at the American Film Institute in Los Angeles in 1977.

1997 Borman started Pacifica Entertainment which merged with Intermedia Films in 2000 forming IM Internationalmedia AG.

In 2009, Borman filed suit against Terminator Salvation co-producers Derek Anderson and Victor Kubicek, alleging fraud and breach of contract after he was allegedly only paid half of his $5 million producing fee for his work in transferring the Terminator rights to the pair.

Filmography
He was a producer in all films unless otherwise noted.

Film

 
Thanks

References

External links
 

American film producers
Living people
Year of birth missing (living people)